Minyon Moore (born May 16, 1958) is an American political activist and civil servant. Moore is the founder of Women Building for the Future, and heads Dewey Square Group's state and local practice. 
She was formerly chief executive officer and before that chief operating officer of the Democratic National Committee, and before that, assistant to the President of the United States, director of the White House Office of Public Liaison, and director of White House political affairs under President Bill Clinton.

Previously, Moore worked as an advisor to the presidential campaigns of Rev. Jesse Jackson in 1984 and 1988. She also served as Governor Michael Dukakis' national deputy field director.

Moore was a senior political consultant to the 2008 Hillary Rodham Clinton presidential campaign, and was considered a member of her inner circle, "Hillaryland". Moore has been called a power player in Hillary Clinton's inner circle as Hillary Clinton began her 2016 campaign for president, as well.

Moore serves on the Democratic National Committee's executive committee. On February 21, 2015, they unanimously voted to adopt a resolution calling for "Right to Vote" Amendment to the U.S. Constitution to explicitly guarantee an individual's right to vote.
She is also on the Black Lives Matter Global Network Foundation’s board of directors

Life 
Moore was born in Chicago, Illinois. She graduated from Boston University's Film School with a certificate in digital film-making and sits on the board of the Writers’ Guild Foundation with leaders in the film and television industry such as Shonda Rhimes, Matthew Weiner, and Sally Wilcox.

Together with Donna Brazile, Leah Daughtry, Tina Flournoy and Yolanda Caraway, Moore is a member of the informal group the "Colored Girls," described by political columnist Matt Bai as "several African-American women who had reached the highest echelons of Democratic politics." Governor Howard Dean, former chair of the DNC, who had one of his dinners with the Colored Girls on the night of the 2014 midterm elections, said their perspective was important. "They’re very rare Washington insiders who understand the rest of the country," Mr. Dean said. "That’s part of what makes them so valuable. These women have not lost their connections with where they came from." In 2018, Moore, Brazile, Daughtry, and Caraway published For Colored Girls Who Have Considered Politics, a joint memoir and history of their time in politics.

On September 5, 2020, Moore was announced to be a member of the advisory council of the Biden-Harris Transition Team, which planned the presidential transition of Joe Biden.

Awards
Moore was named as a Most Influential Leader by Rainbow Push in December, 2014.

She was named one of the 100 Most Powerful Women in Washington by Washingtonian magazine.

Winner of the Tin Cup award by Washington Government Relations Group for her "proven commitment to the enrichment of African American government relations professionals".

Honored with the Spirit of Democracy Award from the National Coalition on Black Civic Participation, award given to leaders who are unselfishly dedicated to education, social and economic justice.

Winner of the Uncommon Height Award: Each year an Uncommon Height Award is presented to one or more individuals who have achieved uncommon heights in excellence of service to others.  Awardees are recognized for their ability to exceed far above and beyond oneself in the same spirit and tradition of Dr. Dorothy Height.

External links
 bio from Dewey Square Group
 bio from The History Makers
 Colored Girls profiled

References

|-

1958 births
American political consultants
Clinton administration personnel
Harvard Kennedy School people
Living people
People from Chicago
United States presidential advisors